The 1898 Western Conference football season was the third season of college football played by the member schools of the Western Conference (later known as the Big Ten Conference) and was a part of the 1898 college football season.

The 1898 Michigan Wolverines football team, under head coach Gustave Ferbert, won the conference championship with a 10–0 record, shut out six opponents, and outscored all opponents by a combined total of 205 to 26.  The team concluded its season by playing Amos Alonzo Stagg's 1898 Chicago Maroons football team for the conference championship.  The Wolverines beat Chicago by a 12–11 score in a game that inspired Louis Elbel to write Michigan's fight song "The Victors."

Wisconsin, under head coach Philip King, compiled a 9–1 record, lost to Chicago, and finished in third place in the conference.

Season overview

Results and team statistics

Key

PPG = Average of points scored per game
PAG = Average of points allowed per game

Regular season
Only 10 conference games were played during the 1898 season as follows:
 October 22, 1898: Chicago defeated Northwestern, 34-5, at Chicago
 October 29, 1898: Wisconsin defeated Minnesota, 29-0, at Madison, Wisconsin
 November 5, 1898: Chicago defeated Purdue, 17-0, at Chicago	
 November 5, 1898: Michigan defeated Northwestern, 6-5, at Ann Arbor, Michigan	
 November 12, 1898: Chicago defeated Wisconsin, 6-0, at Chicago	
 November 12, 1898: Michigan defeated Illinois, 12-5, at Detroit
 November 12, 1898: Minnesota defeated Northwestern, 17-6, at Minneapolis
 November 24, 1898: Illinois defeated Minnesota, 11-10, at Champaign, Illinois	
 November 24, 1898: Michigan defeated Chicago, 12-11, at Chicago
 November 24, 1898: Wisconsin defeated Northwestern, 47-0, at Evanston, Illinois

Notable non-conference games during the 1898 season included the following:
 October 8, 1898: Chicago defeated Iowa, 38–0, at Chicago
 October 8, 1898: Illinois lost to Notre Dame, 5–0, at Champaign, Illinois
 October 12, 1898: Michigan defeated Michigan Agricultural, 39–0, at Ann Arbor (first Michigan–Michigan State football rivalry game)
 October 18, 1898: Purdue defeated Haskell, 5–0, at Lawrence, Kansas
 October 22, 1898 Purdue defeated Haskell, 15–0, at West Lafayette, Indiana
 October 22, 1898: Minnesota lost to Iowa State, 6–0, at Minneapolis
 October 23, 1898: Michigan defeated Notre Dame, 23–0, at Ann Arbor, Michigan
 October 29, 1898: Michigan lost to Penn, 23–11, at Philadelphia
 November 5, 1898: Minnesota defeated , 15–0, at Minneapolis
 November 12, 1898: Purdue defeated Indiana, 14–0, at West Lafayette, Indiana
 November 19, 1898: Illinois lost to Carlisle, 11–0, at Chicago

Bowl games
No bowl games were played during the 1898 season.

All-Western players

Ends
 Neil Snow, Michigan (CW) (CFHOF)
 John W. F. Bennett, Michigan (CW)

Tackles
 Allen Steckle, Michigan (CW)
 Bothne, Northwestern (CW)

Guards
 Rogers, Chicago (CW)
 Bunge, Beloit (CW)

Centers
 William Cunningham, Michigan (CW)

Quarterbacks
 Walter S. Kennedy, Chicago (CW)

Halfbacks
 William Caley, Michigan (CW)
 F. L. Slaker, Chicago (CW)

Fullbacks 
 Pat O'Dea, Wisconsin (CW) (CFHOF)

References